Neniatlanta pauli is a species of small, air-breathing land snail, a terrestrial pulmonate gastropod mollusk in the family Clausiliidae, the door snails, all of which have a clausilium, a sort of sliding door.

This species is found off Bayonne, France and in Spain.

References

 Nordsieck, H. (2007). Worldwide Door Snails (Clausiliidae), Recent and Fossil. ConchBooks, Hackenheim, 214 
 Bank, R. A.; Neubert, E. (2017). Checklist of the land and freshwater Gastropoda of Europe. Last update: July 16, 2017

Clausiliidae
Gastropods described in 1865
Taxa named by Jules François Mabille
Taxonomy articles created by Polbot